Following is a table of United States presidential elections in New Hampshire, ordered by year. Since its admission to statehood in 1788, New Hampshire has participated in every U.S. presidential election.

Winners of the state are in bold.

Elections from 1864 to present

Election of 1860

The election of 1860 was a complex realigning election in which the breakdown of the previous two-party alignment culminated in four parties each competing for influence in different parts of the country. The result of the election, with the victory of an ardent opponent of slavery, spurred the secession of eleven states and brought about the American Civil War.

Elections from 1828 to 1856

Election of 1824

The election of 1824 was a complex realigning election following the collapse of the prevailing Democratic-Republican Party, resulting in four different candidates each claiming to carry the banner of the party, and competing for influence in different parts of the country. The election was the only one in history to be decided by the House of Representatives under the provisions of the Twelfth Amendment to the United States Constitution after no candidate secured a majority of the electoral vote. It was also the only presidential election in which the candidate who received a plurality of electoral votes (Andrew Jackson) did not become President, a source of great bitterness for Jackson and his supporters, who proclaimed the election of Adams a corrupt bargain.

Elections from 1788-89 to 1820

In the election of 1820, incumbent President James Monroe ran effectively unopposed. The popular vote was primarily directed to filling the office of Vice President. The sole electoral vote against Monroe came from William Plumer, an elector from New Hampshire and former United States senator and New Hampshire governor. Plumer cast his electoral ballot for Secretary of State John Quincy Adams. While some accounts claim incorrectly that this was to ensure that George Washington would remain the only American president unanimously chosen by the Electoral College, that was not Plumer's goal. In fact, Plumer simply thought that Monroe was a mediocre president and that Adams would be a better one. Plumer also refused to vote for Tompkins for Vice President as "grossly intemperate", not having "that weight of character which his office requires," and "because he grossly neglected his duty" in his "only" official role as President of the Senate by being "absent nearly three-fourths of the time"; Plumer instead voted for Richard Rush.

See also

 Elections in New Hampshire

Notes

References